Yonchev or Yoncheva is a surname. Notable people with the surname include:

Elena Yoncheva (born 1964), Bulgarian journalist
Kyrill (Yonchev) (1945-2007), Bulgarian bishop
Marin Yonchev (born 1988), Bulgarian singer
Sonya Yoncheva (born 1981), Bulgarian soprano

Bulgarian-language surnames